William P. Cartlidge (June 16, 1942 – March 3, 2021) was an English film and television producer.

Life and career 
William P. Cartlidge was born on June 16, 1942.

Cartlidge worked on three James Bond films, each of which was directed by Lewis Gilbert. He was the first assistant director for the 1967 film You Only Live Twice, the associate producer for the 1977 film The Spy Who Loved Me, and the associate producer for the 1979 film Moonraker.

In 2002, Cartlidge was nominated for an Emmy Award for Outstanding Miniseries at the 54th Primetime Emmy Awards for his work as the producer of Dinotopia.

Cartlidge died on March 3, 2021. He was 78 years old.

Filmography

1960s 
 The Young Ones (1962), second assistant director
 The Punch and Judy Man (1963), second assistant director
 Summer Holiday (1963), second assistant director
 Girl in the Headlines (1963), assistant director
 The Evil of Frankenstein (1964), assistant director
 Strictly for the Birds (1964), assistant director
 Success Machine (1965), assistant director
 Wild Goose Chase (1965), assistant director
 Struggle for a Mind (1965), assistant director
 Dual Control (1965), producer
 Alfie (1966)
 The Reptile (1966), assistant director
 Born Free (1966), assistant director
 The Double Man (1967), assistant director
 You Only Live Twice (1967), assistant director
 Duffy (1968), production manager

1970s 
 The Adventurers (1970), assistant director
 Fragment of Fear (1970), assistant director
 The Last Valley (1971), assistant director
 Friends (1971), assistant director
 Nearest and Dearest (1972), assistant director
 Young Winston (1972), assistant director
 Phase IV (1974), assistant director
 That's Your Funeral (1974), assistant director
 Paul and Michelle (1974), associate producer
 Seven Nights in Japan (1976), associate producer
 The Spy Who Loved Me (1977), associate producer
 Moonraker (1979), associate producer

1980s 
 Educating Rita (1983), co-producer
 Not Quite Jerusalem (1984), co-producer
 Consuming Passions (1988), producer
 Dealers (1989), producer

1990s 
 The Playboys (1992), producer
 Haunted (1995), co-producer
 Incognito (1997), co-producer
 The Scarlet Tunic (1997), executive producer

2000s 
 Dinotopia Part 1 (2002), producer
 Dinotopia Part 2 (2002), producer
 Dinotopia Part 3 (2002), producer

2010s 
 Everything or Nothing 007 (2012), cast member

References

External links

1942 births
2021 deaths
English film producers
English television producers